Montreal Mirror or just Mirror was a free English language alternative newsweekly based in Montreal, Quebec, Canada which was distributed every Thursday. It had a circulation of 70,000 and reached a quarter of a million readers per week.

First published on June 20, 1985, the publication became a weekly in September 1989. It was bought by media giant Quebecor in 1997. It was published by Communications Gratte-Ciel Ltée.

On June 22, 2012, Sun Media (the division of Quebecor that the Mirror belonged to) announced that the paper would be ceasing publication effective immediately.

See also
 List of newspapers in Canada
 Ken Hechtman

References

External links
 Montreal Mirror (official website) (via the Internet Archive)
 Company profile - Verified Audit Circulation (via the Internet Archive)

Alternative weekly newspapers published in Canada
Newspapers published in Montreal
English-language newspapers published in Quebec
Publications established in 1985
Publications disestablished in 2012
Weekly newspapers published in Quebec
1985 establishments in Quebec
2012 disestablishments in Quebec